The Epidemiological Society of London,  also  known  as the Royal Society of Medicine's Epidemiological Society,  was founded in London in 1850 with the objective of investigating the causes and conditions which influence the origin, propagation, mitigation, and prevention of epidemic disease. The society became a part of the Royal Society of Medicine in 1907.


History
Following a severe outbreak of cholera in England in 1831-32 a London physician, J.H.Tucker, proposed in a letter to the Lancet that a society should be formed to specifically study epidemics. The first meeting of the Epidemiological Society of London took place on 6 May 1850 in Hanover Square, London. At a follow up meeting in July, chaired by Anthony Ashley Cooper, 7th Earl of Shaftesbury, a constitution was agreed and officers appointed. Dr. Benjamin Guy Babington, a Guy's Hospital physician, was elected as the first President of the society, whose agreed objectives were:
 to institute rigid examination into the causes and conditions which influence the origin, propagation, mitigation, and prevention of epidemic diseases
 to institute...original and comprehensive researches into the nature and laws of disease
 to communicate with government and legislature on matters connected with the prevention of epidemic diseases.

The seal of the society included the Latin words, venienti occurrite morbo (confront disease at its onset).

For the first ten years of its existence the society's activities were reported in the Lancet, the British Medical Journal, the Medical Times and the Sanitary Review. Thereafter the proceedings were reported in Transactions of the Epidemiological Society of London. The society held regular meetings at which papers were presented.

In 1860, the National  (British)  Association for the Promotion of Social Science (NAPSS) - a Department of Public Health - had as its Head of the Sub-Committee  the  founding President of the Epidemiological  Society: B.G. Babington. Reports from  members of the Epidemiological Society  were recorded at the NAPSS; the two societies being linked courtesy of  their members holding a scientific  interest in matters  epidemiological - e.g.: The society's published transactions  from 1858 include a  report  from the Epidemiological Society which is  followed by  a  miscellaneous paper delivered by  T. M. Greenhow: "Health; how preserved, how impaired". Greenhow's nephew,  Dr E Headlam Greenhow, is listed  as delivering a paper: "Public Health Statistics".  Dr E.H. Greenhow  had held the "Chair" of the Epidemiological  Society in May 1853.

In 1900 the Epidemiological Society held its final Commemoration Dinner. In 1907 it became the Epidemiology and State Medicine section of the Royal Society of Medicine.

Awards
The Edward Jenner medal was instituted by the society in 1896 to commemorate the centenary of Edward Jenner’s first vaccination of a boy against smallpox. It features on one side the head of Jenner and on the other the globe emblem of the Epidemiological Society. It was first presented in 1898 to Sir William Henry Power.

Past Presidents

References

Epidemiology organizations
United Kingdom
Professional associations based in the United Kingdom
Scientific organizations established in 1850
Medical and health organisations based in London
1850 establishments in the United Kingdom